Speaker of the Puducherry Legislative Assembly is the presiding officer of the Legislative Assembly of Puducherry, the main law-making body for the Indian UT of Puducherry. The speaker is always a member of the Legislative Assembly.

History
The Pondicherry Representative Assembly was converted into the Legislative Assembly of Pondicherry on 1 July 1963 as per Section 54(3) of The Union Territories Act, 1963 and its members (who got elected in 1959) were deemed to have been elected to the Legislative Assembly. The elections for the Puducherry Vidhan Sabha held since 1964.

List of the Speakers and Deputy Speakers
The tenure of different speakers of Puducherry Legislative Assembly is given below

Keys:

See also
Government of Puducherry
List of Chief Ministers of Puducherry
List of leaders of the opposition in the Puducherry Legislative Assembly
List of lieutenant governors of Puducherry
Puducherry Legislative Assembly
Pondicherry Representative Assembly
Elections in Puducherry

References

Notes 

Footnotes

 
Lists of legislative speakers in India
Speakers of the Legislative Assembly